Reginald Heber Weller, Jr. (November 6, 1857 – November 22, 1935) was an Episcopal priest and bishop active in the ecumenical movement, establishing a dialogue among Protestant, Catholic, and Eastern Orthodox Christians.

Early life
The son of an Episcopal priest, Reginald Heber Weller, Jr., was born in Jefferson City, Missouri or Jacksonville, Florida on November 6, 1857. He was educated in Florida, where his family moved when he was a boy. After attending the University of the South at Sewanee, Tennessee, Weller received his degree of Bachelor of Divinity at Nashotah House in 1884. He was ordained deacon in 1880. He was ordained a priest in 1884 at All Saints’ Mission, Providence, Rhode Island, after serving his diaconate there. Weller was married to Bessie Brown in 1886 in Eau Claire, Wisconsin. They had one daughter, Ruth, and five sons, Daniel, George, Walter, Horace, and Reginald.

Priesthood
Rectorships at Christ Church, Eau Claire, and St. Matthias, Waukesha, were served before he became rector at Church of the Intercession, Stevens Point, where he was at the time of his election to be Bishop Coadjutor of the Episcopal Diocese of Fond du Lac in 1900.

Election as Bishop

He was consecrated coadjutor on November 8, 1900, at the Cathedral of St. Paul the Apostle in Fond du Lac. Bishops Charles Chapman Grafton and Weller were photographed with these and other bishops wearing copes and mitres, a "Catholic" practice which was not widely accepted in the "Protestant" Episcopal Church at that time. The photo, published widely back east, became known as the Fond du Lac Circus.

Service as Bishop
During his thirty-three years of active service, a longer episcopate than any other in the state at the time, Weller preached in all parts of the country. He held many positions of importance in the church and became widely known in England. He became diocesan bishop on August 30, 1912, after the death of Grafton. He held the position of Superior General of the Confraternity of the Blessed Sacrament from 1913 to 1935, succeeding Grafton who held the office from 1890 to 1912.

In 1919, Weller was a member of the Commission on Faith and Order, which went abroad for a world conference on the fundamentals of the Christian religion seeking to restore communion among Eastern Orthodox, Roman Catholic, and Anglican Christians. Attendants at the Lambeth Conference in 1930 found Weller taking an active part in its deliberations and preaching in several English cathedrals. At home or abroad, Weller was a defender of the faith, a stirring, convincing preacher of great ability, a wise pastor, generous friend, and a man of God.

Weller held many preaching missions, especially in the eastern United States. He took an active and influential part in the deliberations of the House of Bishops. On St. Andrew's Day, November 30, 1929, Weller acted as the chief consecrator at the consecration of Harwood Sturtevant as the Bishop Coadjutor of the diocese. Four years later in November 1933, Bishop Sturtevant succeeded Weller as the fourth bishop of the diocese. He died on November 22, 1935, at the home of his son George in Aurora, Illinois.

See also
 Succession of Bishops of the Episcopal Church in the United States

References

External links
Documents by and about Weller from Project Canterbury
The Diocese of Fond du Lac

1857 births
1935 deaths
Nashotah House alumni
Sewanee: The University of the South alumni
People from Jefferson City, Missouri
People from Fond du Lac, Wisconsin
Episcopal bishops of Fond du Lac